Talladega may refer to:

Talladega, Alabama, a city in northern Alabama, USA
Talladega County, Alabama, which has the city of Talladega as its seat
Talladega National Forest in Alabama
Battle of Talladega, fought between the Tennessee militia and the Red Stick Creek Indians during the Creek War
Talladega Superspeedway, a motorsports complex in Talladega, Alabama
Saab 900 Talladega, a 1997 sport-styled limited edition of the Saab 900 (NG), to commemorate the records achieved at the Talladega Superspeedway with that model the year before
Ford Torino Talladega, a 1969 automobile produced by the Ford Motor Company, named after the racetrack
Talladega Nights: The Ballad of Ricky Bobby, a 2006 American comedy film about NASCAR racing
Talladega College, a liberal arts college in Talladega, Alabama
USS Talladega (APA-208), a Haskell-class attack transport ship of the United States Navy
Richard Petty's Talladega (also sold as Richard Petty's Rennzirkus in Germany, and as Talladega), a 1980s car racing video game
"Talladega" (song), a song by Eric Church